The Journal of Asian Studies, the flagship journal of the Association for Asian Studies, has long been regarded as the most authoritative, prestigious, and selective (the acceptance rate is about 6%) peer-reviewed academic journal in the field of Asian studies. Published by Duke University Press since 2023, under the guidance of its editorial board, it regularly presents the very best empirical and multidisciplinary work on Asia, spanning the arts, history, literature, the social sciences, and cultural studies. In addition to research, current interest, and state-of-the-field articles, a large section of the journal is devoted to book reviews. 

The journal was established in 1941 as The Far Eastern Quarterly, changing to its current title in September 1956. Before 2023, the journal was published by Cambridge University Press.

Editors-in-chief
The following are or have been editor-in-chief of the journal:
 Donald Shively (1956–1959)
 Roger F. Hackett (1959–1962, University of Michigan, Ann Arbor)
 David D. Buck (1990–1994, University of Wisconsin–Milwaukee)
Anand A. Yang (1995–2000, University of Utah)
 Ann Waltner (2001–2004, University of Minnesota)
 Kenneth M. George (2005–2008, University of Wisconsin–Madison)
 Jeffrey Wasserstrom (2008–2018, University of California-Irvine)
 Vinayak Chaturvedi (2018–2021), University of California-Irvine)
 Joseph Alter (2021- ) University of Pittsburgh

Bibliography of Asian Studies
From 1941 to 1991, the Association for Asian Studies published an annual Bibliography of Asian Studies as a supplement to the journal. Since 1991 the bibliography has only been available by separate subscription.

Abstracting and indexing
The journal is abstracted and indexed in the Arts and Humanities Citation Index, Social Sciences Citation Index, and Scopus. According to the Journal Citation Reports, the journal has a 2017 impact factor of 0.917.

References

External links

Academic journals associated with learned and professional societies
Asian studies journals
Cambridge University Press academic journals
English-language journals
Quarterly journals
Publications established in 1941